The following is a list of programs broadcast by Joytv, a regional multiple faith-based television system consisting of two stations in the Canadian provinces of British Columbia (CHNU-DT) and Manitoba (CIIT-DT, now branded Faith TV) that also carries syndicated reruns of family-oriented mainstream programming.

Currently broadcast by CHNU

Faith
The 700 Club Canada
Kenneth Copeland Ministries
The Key to the Kingdom
Life Today with James Robison
Mehak Punjab Di
Peter Popoff Ministries
Tribal Trails

References

External links
Joytv Official Site

Joytv